Mundinger is a surname. Notable people with the surname include:

Ellen Mundinger (born 1955), German high jumper
George Mundinger (1854–1910), American baseball player

See also
Munzinger